Akmal Murodov (born 14 January 1996) is a Tajikistani judoka.

He represented Tajikistan in the men's 81 kg event at the 2020 Summer Olympics in Tokyo, Japan.

References

External links
 

1996 births
Living people
Tajikistani male judoka
Judoka at the 2018 Asian Games
Asian Games competitors for Tajikistan
Judoka at the 2020 Summer Olympics
Olympic judoka of Tajikistan
20th-century Tajikistani people
21st-century Tajikistani people